A Unitarian church is a religious group which follows Unitarianism, Unitarian Universalism, Free Christianity, or another movement with "Unitarian" in its name.

Unitarian church may refer specifically to:

National churches 
 General Assembly of Unitarian and Free Christian Churches, the main body in the United Kingdom
 Unitarian Universalist Association, in the U.S.
 Canadian Unitarian Council
 Unitarian Church of Transylvania, 1565–present, in what is now Romania and Hungary
 Non-subscribing Presbyterian Church of Ireland
 American Unitarian Association, 1825–1961

Local churches

United Kingdom
 Billingshurst Unitarian Chapel, 1754, West Sussex
 Brighton Unitarian Church, 1820, built by Amon Henry Wilds
 Newington Green Unitarian Church, North London
 Rivington Unitarian Chapel, in Lancashire
 Rosslyn Hill Unitarian Chapel, Hampstead, North London; one of the biggest congregations nationally
 Todmorden Unitarian Church, in West Yorkshire
 Toxteth Unitarian Chapel, in Liverpool
 Unitarian Chapel, Liverpool
 Unitarian Meeting House, Ipswich
 York Unitarian Chapel, a building on St. Saviourgate, York, England

United States
 Unitarian Church (Hampton Falls, New Hampshire), NRHP-listed
 Unitarian Church in Summit, in Summit, New Jersey
 Unitarian Church of All Souls, New York City
 Unitarian Church in Charleston, South Carolina
 All Souls Unitarian Church (Tulsa, Oklahoma)
 All Souls Church, Unitarian (Washington, D.C.), founded as the First Unitarian Church of Washington
 Unitarian Church (Burlington, Vermont)
 Unitarian Memorial Church, in Fairhaven, Massachusetts
 Mount Vernon Unitarian Church

See also 
 List of Unitarian, Universalist, and Unitarian Universalist churches
 First Unitarian Church (disambiguation)
 United and uniting churches, formed through the merger between two or more Protestant denominations